Laddie Shaw (born April 8, 1949) is an American politician. He is a Republican representing the 26th district in the Alaska House of Representatives.

Biography
Ladislau Henry Shaw was born in Landshut, Germany and graduated from high school in Flint, Michigan. Shaw received orders to Basic Underwater Demolition/SEAL training (BUD/S) at Naval Amphibious Base Coronado. After six months of training, Shaw graduated BUD/S class 53 in November 1969. He served two tours in South Vietnam with Underwater Demolition Team Thirteen (UDT-13) and SEAL Team ONE; he later served in the Naval Reserve and the Alaska Army National Guard.

Shaw holds a BA from San Diego State University and an MPA from University of Alaska Southeast.

Political career

Alaska House of Representatives
In 2018, Shaw ran for election to represent the 26th district in the Alaska House of Representatives. He won a three-way Republican primary with 44.9% of the vote, and went on the win the general election with 62.3% of the vote.

Shaw sits on the following House committees:
 Military & Veterans' Affairs (Co-Chair)
 University Of Alaska (Finance Subcommittee)
 Administration (Finance Subcommittee)
 Judiciary
 Judiciary (Finance Subcommittee)
 Law (Finance Subcommittee)
 Military & Veterans' Affairs (Finance Subcommittee)
 State Affairs
 Joint Armed Services

Alaska Senate nomination
Following the death of Senator Chris Birch, Alaska Governor Mike Dunleavy picked Shaw to fill the District M seat in the Alaska State Senate in August 2019. However, the Governor's choice required the approval of the Senate, and Shaw was rejected. According to Shaw, he was blocked due to his stance on the amount of the Permanent Fund Dividend: Shaw supports a $3,000 dividend, while some Senate Republicans favor withdrawing less from the fund.

Electoral record

References

1949 births
United States Navy personnel of the Vietnam War
Living people
Republican Party members of the Alaska House of Representatives
Politicians from Anchorage, Alaska
Alaska National Guard personnel
University of Alaska Southeast alumni
University of San Diego alumni
21st-century American politicians